() is a dish originating from the Ardennes department of France. It is made in a Dutch oven with potatoes and onions, and is often served with bacon or smoked sausage. The dish was originally flavoured by rubbing the Dutch oven with bacon before cooking, but was not served with meat, hence the term "nu".

History 
There have not been any documents found that describe the exact place and date of origin of the dish, but it likely comes from the Meuse valley. It was a dish linked to a self-sufficient economy, where the villagers lived off their own agricultural resources.

The dish is mentioned in the work of Gérard Gayot, La Révolution en Ardenne, de l'Argonne au Namurois, during the years 1789–1792. In his work on the Ardennaise countryside in the 19th and 20th century, Jacques Lambert discusses "potée roussie", "roussade", or "potée à cul nu", also called "cacasse" or "frigousse": potatoes cooked with onions and lard.

Agnès Paris discusses the "cacasse" of the habitants of Bogny-sur-Meuse, reserved for days of opulence during the German occupation of France during the Second World War. Françoise Branget also mentions the dish in her book La Cuisine de la République.

Description 
The dish is a symbol of Ardennaise cuisine. It was originally a fricassee of potatoes and a roux, cooked in a cast-iron Dutch oven, that the most modest people consumed when meat was unaffordable.

"À cul nu" indicates the absence of meat, with bacon fat traditionally only being used to add flavour, while the bacon itself was not added to the dish.

Since 2001, the "Confrérie de la Cacasse à cul nu" updated the recipe by adding meat. The dish is now usually served with smoked sausage or slices of bacon.

See also

References

Bibliography

External links 
 La véritable recette de la Cacasse à cul nu ardennaise 
 La cacasse à cul nu des Ardennes 
 Festival of Brotherhoods
 Festival des confréries 
 

Gastronomy in France
Alsatian cuisine
Culture of Grand Est